Sugar Island 37A is an island and First Nations reserve within Rice Lake in southern Ontario. It is one of two reserves of the Alderville First Nation, along with Alderville.

External links
 Aboriginal Affairs and Northern Development Canada profile

Mississauga reserves in Ontario
Communities in Peterborough County